1O or 1-O (the digit "1" and the letter "O") may refer to:
1o Sector, see Primary sector of the economy
Glucogallin, or 1-O-galloyl-beta-D-glucose
Isomalt, or 1-O-alpha-D-glucopyranosyl-D-mannitol
Corilagin, or Beta-1-O-galloyl-3,6-(R)-hexahydroxydiphenoyl-d-glucose
2017 Catalan independence referendum, called for October 1, 2017, known as 1-O

See also
1º (disambiguation) Meaning "1st" in Italian and Spanish
10 (disambiguation) (the digit "1" followed by the digit "0")
I0 (disambiguation) (the letter "I" followed by the digit "0")
IO (disambiguation) (the letter "I" followed by the letter "O")
O1 (disambiguation)